Kurt Vogel Russell (born March 17, 1951) is an American actor. He began acting on television at the age of 12 in the western series The Travels of Jaimie McPheeters (1963–1964). In the late 1960s, he signed a ten-year contract with The Walt Disney Company, where he starred as Dexter Riley in films, such as The Computer Wore Tennis Shoes (1969), Now You See Him, Now You Don't (1972), and The Strongest Man in the World (1975). According to Robert Osborne of Turner Classic Movies, Russell became the studio's top star of the 1970s.

Russell was nominated for a Golden Globe Award for Best Supporting Actor – Motion Picture for his performance in Mike Nichols' Silkwood (1983). In the 1980s, he starred in several films directed by John Carpenter, including anti-hero roles such as army hero-turned-robber Snake Plissken in the futuristic action film Escape from New York (1981), its sequel Escape from L.A. (1996), the horror film The Thing (1982), and the kung-fu comedy action film Big Trouble in Little China (1986). For his portrayal of rock and roll superstar Elvis Presley in Elvis (1979), he was nominated for the Primetime Emmy Award for Outstanding Lead Actor in a Limited or Anthology Series or Movie.

Russell starred in various other films, including Used Cars (1980), The Best of Times (1986), Overboard (1987), Tango & Cash (1989), Backdraft (1991), Tombstone (1993), Stargate (1994), Executive Decision (1996), Breakdown (1997), Vanilla Sky (2001), Miracle (2004), Sky High (2005), Death Proof (2007), The Hateful Eight (2015) and Once Upon a Time in Hollywood (2019). He also appeared in the Fast & Furious franchise as Mr. Nobody, having starred in Furious 7 (2015), The Fate of the Furious (2017), and F9 (2021), portrayed Ego in the Marvel Cinematic Universe (MCU) installments Guardians of the Galaxy Vol. 2 (2017) and What If...? (2021), and subsequently portrayed Santa Claus in The Christmas Chronicles (2018) and The Christmas Chronicles 2 (2020).

Early life 
Kurt Vogel Russell was born on March 17, 1951, at Wesson Maternity Hospital in Springfield, Massachusetts. His father, Bing Russell, was also an actor. His mother, Louise Julia Russell, is a dancer. Russell is of English, Irish, German, and Scottish ancestry. He has three sisters, Jill Franco, Jamie and Jody. His family relocated to California when he was a child, and Russell grew up in the Los Angeles suburb of Thousand Oaks. Russell played little league baseball throughout his grade school years and also on his high school baseball team as a second baseman. He graduated from Thousand Oaks High School in California in 1969. His father played professional baseball. His sister, Jill, is the mother of baseball player Matt Franco. From 1969 to 1975, Russell served in the California Air National Guard and belonged to the 146th Tactical Airlift Wing, then based in Van Nuys.

Career

Child actor 

Russell made his film debut with an uncredited part for It Happened at the World's Fair, playing a boy who kicked a pilot (Elvis Presley) in the leg. On April 24, 1963, Russell guest-starred in the ABC series Our Man Higgins, starring Stanley Holloway as an English butler in an American family.

Later, he played the title role in the ABC western series The Travels of Jaimie McPheeters (1963–64). It was based on Robert Lewis Taylor's eponymous novel, which won the Pulitzer Prize for fiction in 1959.

In 1964, Russell guest-starred in "Nemesis", an episode of the ABC series The Fugitive in which, as the son of police Lt. Phillip Gerard, he is unintentionally kidnapped by his father's quarry, Doctor Richard Kimble. In NBC's The Virginian, he played the mistaken orphan whose father was an outlaw played by Rory Calhoun who was still alive and recently released from prison looking for his son.

Russell played a similar role as a kid named Packy Kerlin in the 1964 episode "Blue Heaven" for the western series Gunsmoke. At age 13, Russell played the role of Jungle Boy on an episode of CBS's Gilligan's Island, which aired on February 6, 1965.

Disney star 
In 1966, the last thing Walt Disney wrote was the name "Kurt Russell" on a piece of paper.

That same year, Russell was signed to a ten-year contract with The Walt Disney Company, where he became, according to Robert Osborne, the "studio's top star of the '70s". Russell's first film for Disney was Follow Me, Boys! (1966). In January 1967, Russell played Private Willie Prentiss in the episode "Willie and the Yank: The Mosby Raiders" in Walt Disney's Wonderful World of Color, released theatrically in some markets as Mosby's Marauders (1967). During this time, Russell continued to guest star on non-Disney TV shows.  He, Jay C. Flippen and Tom Tryon appeared in the episode "Charade of Justice" of the NBC western series The Road West starring Barry Sullivan. In a March 1966 episode of CBS's Lost in Space entitled "The Challenge", he played Quano, the son of a planetary ruler.

While filming the Sherman Brothers theatrical film musical The One and Only, Genuine, Original Family Band (1968), Russell met his future partner Goldie Hawn.

For Disney, he made The Horse in the Gray Flannel Suit (1969) and Guns in the Heather (1969).

Stardom 

Disney promoted Russell to star roles with The Computer Wore Tennis Shoes (1969) which was a big hit. He followed it with The Barefoot Executive (1971), another success.

In 1971, he co-starred as a young robber released from jail, alongside James Stewart in Fools' Parade. Later, he guest-starred in an episode of Room 222 as an idealistic high school student who assumed the costumed identity of Paul Revere to warn of the dangers of pollution.

However, the bulk of his film work was for Disney in films such as Now You See Him, Now You Don't (1971), Charley and the Angel (1973), and Superdad (1973).

Baseball career 
Russell, like his father, had a baseball career. In the early 1970s, Russell was a switch-hitting second baseman for the California Angels minor league affiliates, the Bend Rainbows (1971) and Walla Walla Islanders (1972) in the short season Class A-Short Season Northwest League, then moved up to Class AA in 1973 with the El Paso Sun Kings of the Texas League.

While Russell was in the field turning the pivot of a double play early in the season, the incoming runner at second base collided with him and tore the rotator cuff in Russell's right (throwing) shoulder. He did not return to El Paso, but was a designated hitter for the independent Portland Mavericks in the Northwest League late in their short season. The team was owned by his father, and he had been doing promotional work for them in the interim. The injury forced his retirement from baseball in 1973 and led to his return to acting.

TV star 
In the autumn of 1974, he appeared in the ABC series The New Land, inspired by the 1972 Swedish film of the same name. Critically acclaimed, it suffered very low ratings and aired only six of the 13 episodes. He returned to Disney for The Strongest Man in the World (1975).

Transition into Hollywood 
In 1980, Russell was nominated for an Emmy Award for Outstanding Lead Actor in a Limited Series or a Special for the television film Elvis.  This would transition Russell's Hollywood career after years as a child actor.  It was directed by John Carpenter and led to a series of collaborations between the two men.

Russell starred in Amber Waves (1980) and the comedy Used Cars (1980). He then played Snake Plissken in Escape from New York (1981), directed by Carpenter.

He returned to Disney to provide the voice of Copper as an adult for The Fox and the Hound (1981) then reunited with Carpenter for The Thing (1982), based upon the short story Who Goes There? by John W. Campbell, Jr., which had been interpreted on film before, albeit loosely, in 1951's The Thing from Another World.

He was nominated for the Golden Globe Award for Best Supporting Actor – Motion Picture for his performance in Silkwood (1983).

Russell made Swing Shift (1984) co-starring Goldie Hawn, who became his romantic partner. He starred in The Mean Season (1986) and The Best of Times (1986), then played an antihero truck driver caught in an ancient Chinese war in Big Trouble in Little China, another Carpenter film which, like The Thing, was initially a critical and commercial disappointment but has since gained a cult audience. More popular at the box office was Overboard (1987), a comedy with Goldie Hawn.

1988–present 

Russell credited his performance in Tequila Sunrise (1988) with getting Hollywood to regard him differently. He was in Winter People (1989) then co starred with Sylvester Stallone in Tango & Cash (1989).

Russell played Lt. Stephen "Bull" McCaffrey in Backdraft (1991), Wyatt Earp in Tombstone (1993) and Colonel Jack O'Neil in the military science fiction film Stargate (1994). He also had an uncredited role as the voice of Elvis Presley in the 1994 film Forrest Gump. His portrayal of U.S. Olympic hockey coach Herb Brooks in the 2004 film Miracle, won the praise of critics. "In many ways", wrote Claudia Puig of USA Today, "Miracle belongs to Kurt Russell." Roger Ebert of the Chicago Sun-Times wrote, "Russell does real acting here." Elvis Mitchell of The New York Times wrote, "Mr. Russell's cagey and remote performance gives ''Miracle'' its few breezes of fresh air."

In 2006, Russell claimed in one interview that he had ghost-directed the hit 1993 western film Tombstone on behalf of credited director George P. Cosmatos, saying he gave Cosmatos shot lists. Russell claimed Stallone recommended Cosmatos to him after the removal of the first director, writer Kevin Jarre, but Cosmatos had also worked with Tombstone executive producer Andrew G. Vajna before on Rambo: First Blood Part II. Russell said he promised Cosmatos he would keep it a secret as long as Cosmatos was alive; Cosmatos died in April 2005. Russell said he did not get a chance to edit his version, but Vajna gave him a tape of "everything on the movie" and that he might try to "reconstruct the movie", although he would need to go back to the script and all his notes.

Russell played the villainous Stuntman Mike in Quentin Tarantino's segment Death Proof of the film Grindhouse (2007), and was in two more Tarantino films, The Hateful Eight (2015) and Once Upon a Time in Hollywood (2019). He also had a major role in Guardians of the Galaxy Vol. 2. After a remake of Escape from New York was announced, Russell was reportedly upset with Gerard Butler for playing his signature character, Snake Plissken, as he believed the character 'was quintessentially [...] American.'

Russell appeared in The Battered Bastards of Baseball, a documentary about his father and the Portland Mavericks, which debuted at the Sundance Film Festival in 2014. He co-starred in the action thriller Furious 7 in 2015.

On May 4, 2017, Russell and Goldie Hawn received stars in a double star ceremony on the Hollywood Walk of Fame for their achievements in motion pictures, located at 6201 Hollywood Boulevard.

Personal life 

Russell married actress Season Hubley, whom he met while filming Elvis, in 1979, and had a son, Boston (born February 16, 1980). After his divorce from Hubley in 1983, Russell began his relationship with Goldie Hawn, and appeared alongside her in Swing Shift and Overboard, having previously appeared with her in The One and Only, Genuine, Original Family Band in 1968. They have a son, Wyatt Russell (born July 10, 1986), and own homes in Vancouver, British Columbia; Snowmass Village, Colorado; Manhattan, New York; Brentwood and Palm Desert, California. In an interview with People in December 2020, Russell revealed that he and Hawn never felt the need to marry, stating that a "marriage certificate wasn't going to create anything that otherwise we wouldn't have."

Russell is a libertarian. In 1996, he was quoted in the Toronto Sun saying: "I was brought up as a Republican, but when I realized that at the end of the day there wasn't much difference between a Democrat and Republican, I became a libertarian." In 2020, however, he stated that celebrities should keep their political opinions to themselves, believing that it negatively impacts their work.

Russell is a hunter and a staunch supporter of gun rights, and said that gun control will not reduce terrorism. He is also an FAA-licensed private pilot holding single/multi-engine and instrument ratings, and is an Honorary Council Member of the humanitarian aviation organization Wings of Hope. In 2010, he was inducted as part of the Living Legends of Aviation, receiving the "Aviation Mentor Award" from fellow actor-pilot John Travolta.

In February 2003, Russell and Hawn moved to Vancouver, British Columbia, so that their son could play hockey.

Filmography

Film

Television

Accolades

References

Bibliography 
 Holmstrom, John. The Moving Picture Boy: An International Encyclopaedia from 1895 to 1995. Norwich, Michael Russell, 1996, p. 291–292.

External links 

 
 
 
 

1951 births
20th-century American male actors
21st-century American male actors
Actors from Springfield, Massachusetts
American gun rights activists
American male child actors
American male film actors
American male television actors
American male voice actors
American aviators
American libertarians
Baseball players from California
Bend Rainbows players
Disney people
El Paso Sun Kings players
Living people
Male actors from California
Male actors from Massachusetts
People from Palm Desert, California
People from Greater Los Angeles
Portland Mavericks players
Walla Walla Islanders players
California National Guard personnel
 American people of English descent
 American people of Irish descent
 American people of German descent
 American people of Scottish descent